Eye Contact is the fifth studio album by American experimental music band Gang Gang Dance, released on May 10, 2011. It is the collective's first album to be released under the 4AD banner.

The record is their first and final to feature Jesse Lee handling drumming duties after original drummer Tim Dewit's 2008 departure. Eye Contact also consists of contributions from bassist Tom Koh of Ariel Pink's Haunted Graffiti and Alexis Taylor of alternative dance / synth-pop collective Hot Chip.

Stereogum placed the album at number 6 on its list of the "Top 50 albums of 2011". Uncut placed the album at number 22 on its list while Pitchfork placed the album at 25.

Musical style
Eye Contact follows 2008's lauded Saint Dymphna, which consisted of genres ranging from dance-rock to dubstep to grime.

Eye Contact would follow in the avant-garde footsteps the group had become known and applauded for. However, its accessibility would be heightened more than that of its predecessors, being dubbed as the collective's 'first true "pop" record'. The "murky layers of production, angular, abstract dark corners, and black holes of space and rawness" defining the past Gang Gang Dance works had departed, in the opinion of AllMusic's Thom Jurek.

In contrast, Pitchfork'''s Aaron Leitko did not consider it pop, but rather "the stuff of pop records collected, melted down, and then dribbled Jackson Pollock-style onto a canvas."

 Track listing 

PersonnelGang Gang Dance Lizzi Bougatsos – lead vocals
 Brian Degraw – keyboards
 Josh Diamond – guitar
 Taka Imamura – visual artwork
 Jesse Lee – drumsAdditional personnel''
 Tom Koh – bass guitar on #4
 Alexis Taylor – additional vocals on #7

References 

2011 albums
Gang Gang Dance albums
4AD albums
Experimental music albums by American artists
Electronic albums by American artists
Synth-pop albums by American artists
Worldbeat albums